Alipate Tupouniua (1915 – 19 April 1975) was a Tongan politician. He served as a member of the Legislative Assembly during the 1950s.

Biography
Tupouniua was the son of Pauline Lisimoana and John William Cocker. He became a school inspector and a lay preacher for the Free Church of Tonga. He was elected to the Legislative Assembly in the 1950s from the Tongatapu People's Representatives constituency.

He also served on the Produce Board and Copra Boards until they were abolished in 1974. He died the following year, survived by nine children. His son Mahe served as Deputy Prime Minister and Minister of Finance.

References

1915 births
Tongan Methodists
Tongan civil servants
Members of the Legislative Assembly of Tonga
1975 deaths